Dead Man's Curve is a 1928 American silent action film directed by Richard Rosson and starring Douglas Fairbanks Jr., Sally Blane and Charles Byer.

It was given a British release in 1929.

Cast
 Douglas Fairbanks Jr. as Vernon Keith  
 Sally Blane as Ethel Hume  
 Charles Byer as George Marshall  
 Arthur Metcalfe as Fergus Hume  
 Kit Guard as Goof Goober  
 Byron Douglas as Benton  
 Jim Mason as Derne

References

Bibliography
 James Monaco. The Encyclopedia of Film. Perigee Books, 1991.

External links

1928 films
1920s action films
American action films
American auto racing films
Films directed by Richard Rosson
American silent feature films
Film Booking Offices of America films
American black-and-white films
1920s English-language films
1920s American films